Wilhelm "Willy" Lützow (19 May 1892 – 31 October 1915) was a German breaststroke swimmer, who competed in the 1912 Summer Olympics. In the 200 metre breaststroke competition he won the silver medal next to his teammate Walter Bathe. In the 400 metre breaststroke event he participated in the final, but was not able to finish the race. He was killed in action during World War I.

See also
 List of Olympians killed in World War I

References

1892 births
1916 deaths
German male breaststroke swimmers
German male swimmers
Olympic swimmers of Germany
Swimmers at the 1912 Summer Olympics
Olympic silver medalists for Germany
German military personnel killed in World War I
Medalists at the 1912 Summer Olympics
Olympic silver medalists in swimming
Missing in action of World War I